Shahurain bin Abu Samah (born 23 December 1986 in Kajang, Selangor) is a Malaysian footballer who plays as a midfielder.
Shahurain began his early career with Selangor President's Cup Team. He was part of the Negeri Sembilan squad that won the 2009 Malaysia Cup by scoring the first goal in a 3–1 win against Kelantan in the final. He also played for Malaysian national team.

Club career

PKNS
In April 2014, Shahurain joined PKNS.

References

External links
 Shahurain Abu Samah's Profile at F.A.M. website
 

1986 births
Living people
Malaysian footballers
Malaysia international footballers
Negeri Sembilan FA players
PDRM FA players
People from Selangor
Association football midfielders
Association football forwards